Ñawpa Pacha, Journal of Andean Archaeology is a biannual peer-reviewed academic journal published by Taylor & Francis on behalf of the Institute of Andean Studies (Berkeley, California). Ñawpa Pacha means "Antiquity" in the Quechua language. It was established by John Howland Rowe in 1963.

The journal's current editor-in-chief since 2011 is Jerry Moore.

Scope 
Articles published in Ñawpa Pacha cover topics such archaeology, history, linguistics, ethnology and biology of ancient cultures from the Andes of South America.

Abstracting and indexing 
The journal is abstracted and indexed in IBZ Online, Anthropological Literature, Hispanic American Periodicals Index, JournalTOCs and Latindex.

References

External links

Institute of Andean Studies

Archaeology journals
Taylor & Francis academic journals
Publications established in 1963
Biannual journals
English-language journals
Latin American studies journals
1963 establishments in California